The Kağıthane–Piyalepaşa Tunnel is a twin-tube road tunnel under the inner city of Istanbul, Turkey connecting the Kağıthane district and Piyalepaşa Boulevard in Beyoğlu district.

The tunnel is part of a project of the Istanbul Metropolitan Municipality to build seven tunnels for the "City of Seven Hills", which is the nickname of Istanbul. It was opened on 14 March 2009 as the first tunnel of this project after a construction time of four years. Its southeast entry is situated on the Piyalepaşa Boulevard, which runs between the neighborhoods Okmeydanı and Kasımpaşa. The northwest entry is located in Kağıhane.

References

Road tunnels in Turkey
Buildings and structures in Istanbul
Tunnels completed in 2009
Beyoğlu
Kağıthane
Tunnels in Istanbul